Thomas Duncan (general) (1819–1887) was a Union Army brevet brigadier general. General Duncan may also refer to:

Alastair Duncan (British Army officer) (1952–2016), British Army major general
Alexander Duncan (army officer) (1780–1859), East India Company general
George B. Duncan (1861–1950), U.S. Army major general
John Duncan (British Army officer, born 1870) (1870–1960), British Army major general
John Duncan (British Army officer, born 1872) (1872–1948), British Army major general
Johnson K. Duncan (1827–1862), Confederate States Army brigadier general